Naba Raj Lamsal is a Nepalese poet, radio journalist, and government official. He is a director of program division of Radio Nepal. He started his poetry journey in 1984, publishing his first poem in Arunodaya paper titled Bandana.

Early life and education 
Lamsal was born and brought up in Nilkantha, Dhading in a Hindu priest family, the son of Tanka Prasad Lamsal and Hem Kumari Lamsal. He grew up listening to Sanskrit chants by his father, which influence his interest in poetry at a very young age. He moved to Kathmandu for further studies after finishing primary education in his hometown.

He started his professional career at Radio Nepal as a radio host in 1994.

Awards 

In 2022, he won the Madan Puraskar, Nepal's highest literary honor, for his epic Agni. The book was selected out of 299 submission.

Works

References

External links
 

1969 births
Nepali-language writers from Nepal
Madan Puraskar winners
Nepalese male writers
People from Dhading District
Living people